Approximately 38 people have been head of the Russian government since its establishment in 1905.

The Council of Ministers of the Russian Empire, created in November 1905, was preceded by a number of cabinet-like institutions. Oldest of them was the Supreme Privy Council, created in 1726 by the empress Catherine I. Considering weakness of her and her successor's powers, the Council acted as government of the Russian Empire until 1731. Its successor departments such as the Cabinet of Her Imperial Majesty (1731–41), the Conference at the Highest Court (1756–62), the Imperial Council (1762) and finally the Council at the Highest Court (1768–1801) remained mostly advisory bodies to the monarch.

The ministerial reform of 1802 introduced the Committee of Ministers, which competence was limited to interagency issues. The Committee was not responsible for the activities of individual ministries and for the coherence of their policies. Beginning with Count Aleksandr Romanovich Vorontsov, the eldest of the officers was de facto chairman of the committee. Eight years after the inauguration of the manifest, the first de jure office holder was Count Nikolay Rumyantsev. According to the tradition established over time, the chairmanship of the Committee was the last honorary position, to which elderly respected officials were appointed.

The Council of Ministers consisted of chairmen of the State Council and the Committee of Ministers, as well as high-ranking officers appointed by the Emperor.

The imperial Council of Ministers was re-established in late 1905, as a part of the large-scale government reform caused by the First Russian Revolution. All ministries and departments became parts of a single national administration. The Committee of Ministers functioned simultaneously with the second session of the Council of Ministers for six more months; Count Sergei Witte participated on both entities until the abolition of the committee on  April (5 May) 1906.

By the order of Emperor Nicholas II, the second session of the Council of Ministers began on  October (1 November) 1905, following the formation of the State Duma.

In November 1917 the Provisional Government was overthrown by the Bolshevik faction of Russian social democrats led by Vladimir Lenin. The Council of People's Commissars of the Russian Soviet Republic became the new governmental body, which was chaired from 1917–24 by Lenin. That body was renamed Council of Ministers following a decree of the Supreme Council on 23 March 1946. The same was made in other republics of the Soviet Union.

After the fall of the Soviet Union, Boris Yeltsin, as the President of the Russian Federation, was appointed as the extraordinary head of government of the Russian Federation. The latter body took the name "Council of Ministers — Government of Russia", the chairman of which became Viktor Chernomyrdin, replacing acting chairman Yegor Gaidar. According to the new constitution ratified on 25 December 1993, the "Government" is the official name of the Russian cabinet. Since then, the head of that office takes the formal title "Chairmen of the Government" or colloquially "Prime Minister."

Current Prime Minister Mikhail Mishustin took the office on 16 January 2020.

The youngest head of government by his accession to office was Sergey Kiriyenko (1998), at age 35, and the oldest Ivan Goremykin (1914), at age 74.

Russian Empire (1721–1917)

Early collegial institutions without a single leader 
Since the 18th century, a modern system of public administration was going to be created in Russia, including the formation of bodies such as the Supreme Privy Council and the Committee of Ministers whose powers are similar to the powers of the modern Russian Government. In the period from 1726 to 1905 there was no official title for the leader of the government. The chief ministers (principal ministres) of certain Emperor of All Russia nonetheless led the government de facto, but de jure the head of government was a monarch.

Committee of Ministers (1802–1905) 
The Committee of Ministers was established on 20 September 1802 in the course of Alexander I's ministerial reform. All the ministers were independent from each other and were responsible for the activities of their departments individually. The Committee was not responsible either for the activities of individual ministries, or for the coherence of their policies. During the first years of the existence of the Committee, its meetings were chaired by the Emperor, and in his absence - by the ministers alternately, starting with the senior in rank, each for 4 sessions. In 1810, the chairmanship was given to the chancellor and chairman of the State Council Count N.P. Rumyantsev.

Prime Minister of the Russian Empire (1905–1917)
The modern government type in Russia came after the establishment of the Council of Ministers on 1 November 1905, created for the "management and union action principal chiefs of departments on subjects like law and senior public administration", and modelled on the relevant institutions within the constitutional states, when all the ministries and directorates have been declared part of the unified state management. The first Prime Minister was Count Sergei Witte, who was appointed on 6 November 1905.

Provisional Government/Russian Republic (1917)
After the alleged abdication of Nicholas II from the throne in favor of his brother Michael, Michael also abdicated, before the convening of the Constituent Assembly. On 14 September 1917, the Russian Republic was proclaimed. At this period, a provisional government was formed and the Prime Minister was the head of state.

Russian State (1918–1920)
The heads of government of the Russian State during the Civil War were de facto Prime Ministers in exile.

Russian Soviet Federative Socialist Republic (1917–1991) 
Since the creation of the Russian Soviet Republic its cabinet was styled as the Council of People's Commissars. Between the creation of the USSR on 30 December 1922 and the formation of its own Council of People's Commissars on 6 July 1923, the Council of People's Commissars of Russia temporarily acted as the government of the USSR. On 23 March 1946, the Council of People's Commissars was renamed into the Council of Ministers of the RSFSR.

Russian Federation (1991–present)

Acting prime ministers
Vladimir Kokovtsov: 18–22 September 1911
Konstantin Pamfilov: 5 May 1942 – 2 May 1943
Oleg Lobov: 26 September – 6 November 1991
Yegor Gaidar: 15 June – 14 December 1992
Sergey Kiriyenko: 23 March – 24 April 1998
Viktor Chernomyrdin: 9–10 August 1996 and 23 August – 11 September 1998
Sergey Stepashin: 12–19 May 1999
Vladimir Putin: 9–16 August 1999
Mikhail Kasyanov: 7–17 May 2000
Viktor Khristenko: 24 February – 5 March 2004
Mikhail Fradkov: 7–12 May 2004 and 12–14 September 2007
Viktor Zubkov: 7–8 May 2008 and 7–8 May 2012
Dmitry Medvedev: 7–8 May 2018 and 15–16 January 2020
Andrey Belousov: 30 April – 19 May 2020.

Timeline

See also 
 Prime Minister of Russia
 Politics of Russia
 Government of Russia
 Premier of the Soviet Union
 Bald–hairy

Notes

References

Citations

Sources 

 
 
 
 A. A. Polovtsov, ed. (1896–1918). Русский биографический словарь (Russian Biographical Dictionary) (in Russian). Saint Petersburg: Russian Imperatorial Historical Society of Saint Petersburg

External links 
 Heads of State and Government of the Soviet Union (1922–1991)

Russia
Heads of government

Heads of government
Russia